The 2004 Super Fours was the third cricket Super Fours season. It took place in May and June and saw 4 teams compete in a 50 over league and, for the first time, a knockout Twenty20 tournament. V Team were the winners of both tournaments.

Competition format
In the one day tournament, teams played each other twice in a round-robin format, with the winners of the group winning the tournament. Matches were played using a one day format with 50 overs per side.

The group worked on a points system with positions within the divisions being based on the total points. Points were awarded as follows:

Win: 15 points. 
Tie:  6 points. 
Loss: 0 points.

A Twenty20 competition was added for the 2004 edition of the Super Fours, which consisted of two semi-finals, with the winners proceeding to the Final and the losers playing in a third-place play-off.

Teams

50 over

Results

Source: Cricket Archive

Twenty20

Semi-finals

Third-place play-off

Final

References

Super Fours